Giuseppe Maria Pignatelli, C.R. (1660–1703) was a Roman Catholic prelate who served as Bishop of Cava de' Tirreni (1696–1703).

Biography
Giuseppe Maria Pignatelli was born in Naples, Italy in 1660 and ordained a priest in the Congregation of Clerics Regular of the Divine Providence.
On 17 December 1696, he was appointed during the papacy of Pope Innocent XII as Bishop of Cava de' Tirreni.
On 21 December 1696, he was consecrated bishop by Sperello Sperelli, Bishop of Terni, with Michele de Bologna, Bishop of Isernia, and François Marie Sacco, Bishop of Ajaccio, serving as co-consecrators. He was responsible for the construction of the episcopal palace in Cava.
He served as Bishop of Cava de' Tirreni until his death on 22 March 1703.

References

External links and additional sources
 (for Chronology of Bishops)
 (for Chronology of Bishops)

17th-century Italian Roman Catholic bishops
18th-century Italian Roman Catholic bishops
Bishops appointed by Pope Innocent XII
17th-century Neapolitan people
1660 births
1703 deaths
18th-century Neapolitan people